The National Defense Authorization Act for Fiscal Year 2018 (NDAA 2018, Pub.L. 115–91) is a United States federal law which specifies the budget, expenditures and policies of the U.S. Department of Defense (DOD) for Fiscal Year 2018.  Analogous NDAAs have been passed in previous and subsequent years.

Background
The Trump Administration released its fiscal year 2018 budget request on 23 May 2017, requesting $677.1 billion for the federal government's national defense-related activities. $667.6 billion of that amount was for discretionary funding to be provided by an annual appropriations bill. For fiscal year 2018, the cap set by the Budget Control Act of 2011 on discretionary defense spending was $549 billion. The Trump Administration budget request exceeded this cap by $46 billion.

Legislative history

House vote
H.R. 2810, the version of the NDAA 2018 which was reported by the House Armed Services Committee, was passed by the House of Representatives on 14 July 2017 in a 344–81 vote.

Senate vote
The Senate Armed Services Committee reported its version of the NDAA 2018 bill, S. 1519, on 10 July. The text of S. 1519 was substituted for the House-passed text of H.R. 2810, and Senate passed an amended version of H.R. 2810 on 18 September in an 89–8 vote.

Presidential signature
President Donald Trump signed the NDAA 2018 on 12 December 2017.

Sections of the Act

Supply chain security
Section 807 relates to the need to enhance supply chain security in relation to defense supplies, and directs the Secretary of Defense to integrate supply chain risk management into acquisition decision making, and to co-ordinate with interagency, industrial and international partners as necessary to support a government-wide approach to supply chain risk.

Foreign Spill Protection Act of 2017 
Florida congressmen Carlos Curbelo (R) and Patrick Murphy (D) proposed the Foreign Spill Protection Bill in 2015 to change the Oil Pollution Act (OPA) to ensure the costs of foreign oil spills in American waters are incurred by the responsible party. The bill was passed with no opposition in the House in April 2016 but did not pass in the Senate. Curbelo brought back the bill in 2017 with Florida U.S. Representative Darren Soto (D) as the chief cosponsor. The Foreign Spill Protection Act was subsequently passed as section 3508 of the NDAA for fiscal year 2018.

Intermediate-Range Nuclear Forces (INF) Treaty Preservation Act of 2017 
The Intermediate-Range Nuclear Forces Treaty (INF) removes American and Russian ground-launched intermediate-range missiles. The NDAA 2018 includes a $25 million fund for developing a new road-mobile ground-launched cruise missile which would be prohibited by the INF Treaty. The Intermediate-Range Nuclear Forces (INF) Treaty Preservation Act of 2017 included within the NDAA 2018 explicitly calls for the establishment of an American missile program that violates the terms of the INF Treaty. Pentagon spokesman Thomas Crosson stated, "We are prepared to stop such research and development if Russia returns to verifiable compliance with the Treaty."

Saving Federal Dollars Through Better Use of Government Purchase and Travel Cards Act of 2017 
The NDAA included a bill for the Saving Federal Dollars Through Better Use of Government Purchase and Travel Cards Act, which was proposed by U.S. Senators Chuck Grassley (R-Iowa), Tom Carper (D-Delaware), and Claire McCaskill (D-Missouri) to crack down on waste, fraud, and abuse in the spending on travel and purchase cards by federal agencies.

Modernizing Government Technology Act 
The 2018 NDAA included the Modernizing Government Technology Act (MGT Act), which would fund IT modernization projects in the federal government with $250 million each in fiscal 2018 and fiscal 2019. The money is to be held by GSA in a category called the Technology Modernization Fund.  The MGT act requires agency CIOs to evaluate applications from within their agencies, and if funding is received to report on the projects every six months.  The MGT had evolved from proposals by Reps. Will Hurd and Steny Hoyer who had combined efforts in September 2016.

References

External links 
 National Defense Authorization Act for Fiscal Year 2018 (PDF/details) as amended in the GPO Statute Compilations collection
 National Defense Authorization Act for Fiscal Year 2018 (PDF/details) as enacted in the US Statutes at Large

U.S. National Defense Authorization Acts
Acts of the 115th United States Congress